Panigrahi is an Indian surname that may refer to the following notable people:
Aasutosh Panigrahi, Indian artist
Ashok Kumar Panigrahi, Indian Radio Broadcaster
Bhagabati Charan Panigrahi (1907–1943), Indian writer and politician
Chintamani Panigrahi (1922–2000), Indian Independence Movement activist
Durga Charan Panigrahi (born 1961), Indian mining scientist
Ghanshyam Panigrahi (1881–?), Indian freedom fighter and politician
Gopinath Panigrahi (1924–2004), Indian botanist and plant taxonomist
Kalindi Charan Panigrahi (1901–1991), Indian poet, novelist, story writer, dramatist, and essayist
Krishna Chandra Panigrahi (1909–1987), Indian historian and archaeologist 
Raghunath Panigrahi (1932–2013), Indian vocalist, composer and music director
Sanjukta Panigrahi (1944–1997), Indian dancer
Sriballav Panigrahi (1940–2015), Indian politician
Sulagna Panigrahi, Indian television and film actress
Ratikanta Panigrahi (2007-till date),Owner of 4 petrol pump